The Winfield Smouse House, is a historic structure located in Washington, Iowa, United States. It was listed on the National Register of Historic Places in 1983.  Winfield Smouse arrived in Washington in 1867.  He was initially involved in retail grocery and hardware.  He invested in real estate and he ended up platting and developing five major additions to the city.  By the time he died he was considered the wealthiest person in town.  The two-story brick houses is a local adaptation of the Prairie School style. The house has subsequently been converted into a restaurant.

References

Houses completed in 1916
Houses in Washington County, Iowa
Washington, Iowa
Prairie School architecture in Iowa
National Register of Historic Places in Washington County, Iowa
Houses on the National Register of Historic Places in Iowa